The racial resentment scale is a measure of symbolic racism created by Donald Kinder and Lynn M. Sanders for the American National Election Studies in the 1980s. It has been considered the dominant measure of symbolic racism since its inception.

History
The racial resentment scale was developed in the 1980s by Donald Kinder and Lynn M. Sanders, who developed it on behalf of the American National Election Study. In 2020, a review listed it as the dominant measure of symbolic racism in the decades since its creation. It has also been called the most commonly utilized measure of racial resentment. The scale has three pillars: anti-black affect, belief in the idea that African Americans have not conformed to the Protestant work ethic, and denial of ongoing discrimination against African Americans.

Purpose and structure
Kinder and Sanders defined racial resentment as "the conjunction of whites' feelings towards blacks and their support for American values, especially secularized versions of the Protestant ethic". They referred to racial resentment as "new racism", stating that it was less a belief in the innate inferiority of African Americans, but rather, the notion that they do not live up to American values like Protestant morality and a hard work ethic. Thus, the racial resentment scale's stated purpose was to identify White Americans who were "generally sympathetic" to Black Americans, or conversely, unsympathetic.
The standard racial resentment scale is a list of four statements, with respondents indicating how strongly they agree or disagree with each one:
 Irish, Italian, and Jewish ethnicities overcame prejudice and worked their way up. Blacks should do the same without any special favors.
 Generations of slavery and discrimination have created conditions that make it difficult for blacks to work their way out of the lower class.
 Over the past few years, blacks have gotten less than they deserve.
 It's really a matter of some people just not trying hard enough: if blacks would only try harder they could be just as well off as whites.

In the expanded version, a further two statements are included:
 Government officials usually pay less attention to a request or complaint from a black person than from a white person
 Most blacks who receive money from welfare programs could get along without it if they tried

Results and effectiveness
In the US, surveys have found that typically, Republicans score higher on the scale than Democrats. Additionally, in the 2016 United States presidential election, supporters of then-candidate Donald Trump had higher racial resentment scores than supporters of other Republican candidates. The racial resentment scale has been criticized for not separating racism from ideas like conservatism or individualism. Some political scientists have attributed Republicans' higher resentment scores to the fact that they typically favor less government intervention; they are more averse to government assistance to the poor, regardless of race. Believers in the Just-world hypothesis, who therefore believe that one's fate is morally fair and a direct result of one's own actions, also score higher on the racial resentment scale.

Several studies have found that racial resentment scores are lower among younger Americans.

The wording of the statements has been criticized for being vague or otherwise imprecise. For example, in the statement, "Over the past few years, blacks have gotten less than they deserve," it is not stated what Black Americans have gotten less of, or relative to whom.

According to a 2021 study, measures of explicit anti-black prejudice predicted discrimination by white Americans against blacks during an Ultimatum Game, but racial resentment did not.

References

Racism in the United States